Oldendorf (Luhe) is a municipality in the district of Lüneburg, in Lower Saxony, Germany.

Nearby is an important neolithic gravesite, the Oldendorfer Totenstatt which has been well preserved.

References